Biljana Majstorović (born 31 December 1959 in Belgrade) is a former basketball player who competed for Yugoslavia in the 1980 Summer Olympics and in the 1984 Summer Olympics.

References

1959 births
Living people
Basketball players from Belgrade
Yugoslav women's basketball players
Serbian women's basketball players
ŽKK Partizan players
Olympic basketball players of Yugoslavia
Basketball players at the 1980 Summer Olympics
Basketball players at the 1984 Summer Olympics
Olympic bronze medalists for Yugoslavia
Olympic medalists in basketball
Centers (basketball)
Medalists at the 1980 Summer Olympics
Universiade medalists in basketball
Universiade bronze medalists for Yugoslavia
Medalists at the 1983 Summer Universiade
Medalists at the 1985 Summer Universiade